Joanne Guest (born 22 February 1972) is an English former glamour model and media personality.

Glamour career 
Born and raised in Chesterfield, north east Derbyshire, England, Guest started in modelling after she saw an advertisement while on a catering course at her local college. She appeared as a Page 3 girl in The Sun  and has also appeared in the magazines Loaded  and FHM. She also appeared in the Playboy video Shagalicious British Babes.

Guest appeared in a wide range of British "top shelf" magazines, including, Escort, Mayfair, Men Only, Men's World, Razzle  and Whitehouse. From 2000 she was a television host for the Men and Motors cable/satellite channel in the UK, operated by Granada Television.

Guest also appeared in an interactive erotic magazine for PC called Interactive Girls. She starred in an erotic PC game called Jo Guest in the Milk Round, released by Interactive Girls Club in 1994.

Other media work 
In 1995 Guest appeared in the Damian Hurst directed music video for Blur song "Country House" together with Matt Lucas, Keith Allen and Sara Stockbridge.

In 2002 Guest promoted her proposed move into competitive rally driving.

Starting with the June 2002 issue, Guest had a monthly advice column in Front magazine. She had previously appeared in a weekly "agony babe" advice column in the Daily Star newspaper from November 1998 to March 2000.

Guest hosted a number of television programmes on the Granada Men & Motors cable/satellite channel in the UK. Shows include:

 Jo Guest's Private Parts (Nov 1998)
 Undressed with Guest (the second series was shown in Spring 1999)
 Jo Guest in Jamaica (Jan-Feb 2000)
 Jo Guest’s Capital Exposed (Nov 2002)
 The Steam Room: with Jo Guest (Oct 2004)
 Jo Guest UK Exposed (Nov 2004)
 British Babes Exposed (included The Steam Room: with Jo Guest) (Oct 2008)

Guest also appeared in the third series of the British TV show, I'm Famous and Frightened!  and in the seventh series, episode one of the British show GamesMaster.

On 21 January 2008, she was a guest on the television show This Morning, during which she discussed a mystery illness she had been suffering from for the past 14 months that had left her unable to work and that doctors had been unable to diagnose. On 10 April 2008 she returned as a guest on This Morning and confirmed that, as a direct result of help from viewers that had seen her previous appearance, she had been diagnosed with fibromyalgia.

References

External links 

 

1972 births
English female adult models
Glamour models
Living people
Page 3 girls
People from Chesterfield, Derbyshire